Hearts of Darkness is a Community whose original material absorbs influences from 1970s afrobeat to hip hop, 1960s and 1970s soul and funk, as well as reaching back to 1920s big band . The sound evokes memories of Count Basie, James Brown, and Fela Kuti Jamming with Nina Simone, Erykah Badu and Sun Ra.

Personnel 
Les Izmore: Vocals, Shekere
Erica Townsend: Vocals
Rachel Christia: Vocals
Leena Will: Vocals
Erin Bopp: Vocals 
Philip "So Smooth" Keegan: Shekere
Brad "Bad Brad" Williams: Kit, Percussion
Miko Spears: Congas
Dominique Sanders: Bass Guitar
Lucas Parker: Rhythm Guitar
Sam Goodell: Keys
Chalis O'neal: Trumpet 
Ernest Melton: Saxophones
Jolan Smith: Tenor Sax - Vocals

Discography

Albums 
Hearts of Darkness (2010) 
Shelf Life (2012)

EPs 
Numeration (2012)

Notes

References

External links

2007 establishments in Missouri
Big bands
Musical groups from Kansas City, Missouri